Ni Guangjiong (born December 29, 1934, in Ningbo, Zhejiang) is a Chinese physicist and science writer. He began studies in physics about 1950, and became a Doctor of Philosophy in 1955. He married Su Qing, a physics professor, in 1960. He published his first book in 1978. He holds a Chair in Physics at Fudan University, Shanghai. He is the director of Modern Physics Institute and the head of the Division for Theoretical Physics.

He is a specialist in quantum mechanics, field theory, and particle physics. His books include Modern Physics (1979), Methods of Mathematical Physics (1989), Levinson Theorem, Anomaly and Phase Transition of Vacuum (1995), Physics Changing the World (1998), and Advanced Quantum Mechanics (2000).

Accelerating universe: the role of the antimatter 
Ni is studied by several authors in astrophysics and for the theories of the antimatter, that he includes in the cosmological model that he proposes.

The theories of Ni about antimatter are also used for invariances of scale within the framework as Quantum tunnelling and it is within the framework of this cosmological model that Ni develops an important part of his study with regard to the neutrinos.

International works about a superluminal speed of the (muon) neutrino
Ni claimed to prove that the muon neutrino exceeded the speed of light in vacuum. He spent most of his career studying this.
This work was cited on many occasions by international teams of scientists and in several anthologies.

Distinctions 
Ni received scientific awards recognized nationally in China, inter alia :
 Award of the worker models national (for his research) in 1979
 Progress Award in 1988 for state education delivered by the Commission of the Chinese Academy of Sciences and Technology
 Progress Award delivered by the Ministry for the teaching of sciences and technology for a work on the theorem of Levinson left in 1995
 National outstanding commendation award of teaching in 2002 for a work entitled "world Change in physics"
 National award for the colleges of teaching and universities for a book about quantum Mechanical "advanced" in 2002.

Guang-Jiong Ni has also been quoted in the field of philosophy and by Siemens.

Bibliography
 Modern Physics (1979)
 Methods of Mathematical Physics (1989)
 Levinson Theorem, Anomaly and Phase Transition of Vacuum (1995)
 Physics Changing the World (1998)

Anthologies containing his writings
 Relativity, Gravitation, Cosmology, Contemporary Fundamental Physics, under the direction of Valeri Dvoeglazov
 Surface Physics and Related Topics: Festschrift for Xide Xie, with  Fujia Yang, Xun Wang and Kai-Ming Zhang
 Advanced Quantum Mechanics, with Su-qing Chen

See also
 Neutrino
 Neutrino oscillation
 Solar neutrino problem
 Cosmic neutrino background
 Faster than light
 Special relativity
 Speed of light
 OPERA experiment
 MINOS
 Wheeler–Feynman absorber theory

References 

Academic staff of Fudan University
1934 births
Living people
Physicists from Zhejiang
Scientists from Ningbo
Fudan University alumni
Relativity theorists
People's Republic of China science writers
Writers from Ningbo
Educators from Ningbo